Sthreedhanam was an Indian Malayalam-language television soap opera drama. The show  premiered on Asianet channel and streaming on Hotstar from 2 July 2012 to 14 May 2016.

Kannada actress Chithra Shenoy along with Divya Padmini and Rajiv Roshan played the major roles.

It is remade in Tamil as Ponnukku Thanga Manasu on Star Vijay. It is remade in Telugu on Star Maa as Kante Koothurne Kanali.

Plot
The show begins with Prashanthan's wedding. He is the eldest among Sethulakshmi and Lakshmanan Pillai's three sons. They belong to the refined Palat clan.

Sethulakshmi is a dominant and greedy mother who forcefully pushed Prashanthan to marry Divya from the Meledath family. But Sethulakshmi was not happy that Divya will be part of their family with a worthless grant and small gold. All she wants is Divya's wealth. She used her power as Divya's mother-in-law and gave Divya and her parents an extremely big trouble. Mayuri is the cousin of Prashanthan asked about what is going on in the Palat's family.

She wished to ruin Prashanthan and Divya's marriage because she wants to become Prashanthan's wife. She uses deceitful tricks when there is a chance. Meanwhile, Sethulakshmi found out that Divya's jewelry are all fake, so she brings Divya back to their house. And later finds out that it is a settlement between Prashanthan and Govindhan, Divya's father. So she decided that Divya can only come back to their house if she provides her entire ornaments.

Govindhan borrowed money to buy what Sethulakshmi wants and returned her daughter to the Palat's house. Prakashan, the younger brother of Prashanthan, is in love with Veni. Sethulakshmi accepts her because she came from a wealthy family. Their marriage was arranged, and the conceited Veni entered the Palat's household. However, Sethulakshmi did not give her freedom. And that's where the story goes.

The film is based on Sthreedhanam by C. V. Nirmala. It deals with the problems created by dowry in a middle class Malayali family. This film has also been interpreted in a serial, with the same name.

Cast

Main
 Divya Vishwanth as Divya Prasanth MLA
Chithra Shenoy as Palat Sethulakshmi
Sonu Satheesh Kumar as Veni
Rajeev Roshan as Prashanthan
Midhun/Prakash as Indran
Ambarish / Dheepan Murali as Prasad
Vishnu Prakash as Lekshmanan (Lekshmi) Pillai
Kottayam Rasheed as Mathi Suku
Rajeev Ganesh as Prakashan

Recurring
Arya Rohit as Pooja Prasad
Deepa Jayan as Prema
Haridas as Dr.Vinayan
Sidha Raj as Swaminathan
Kavitha Lakshmi as Santha Sukumaran
Gayathri Varsha as Prema's Mother in law
Sini Varghese as Mayuri
Rajani Murali as Mayuri's mother
Arya Sreeram / Dini Daniel as Varada
 Amala Rose Kurian/ Alice Christy as Keerthana
Molly kannamaly as Chala Mary
Senthil Krishna as Natholi Nelson
Santosh Sashidharan as Ananthan
Mahesh as Dinakaran
Madhu Mohan as Manuel
Sruthy as Razia
Anoop Sai as Appu
Lakshmi as Devi
Harikumaran Thampi as Thanku
Sajan Surya as Film actor Kiran (Extended Cameo)
Shibu Laban as Chandrahasanan 
Vijayan as SI Shoolapaani
Sumi Santosh
Pratheeksha G Pradeep
Jayakumar Parameswaran Pillai
Sreejith Cheruvally
Varsha 
Jismy
Navya
Apsara
Swathi Thara
Jose Perrorkada
Vanchiyoor Praveen Kumar
Bindu Murali as Pooja's mother
Sreedevi Anil
Revathi

Adaptations

References

External links
 Official Website on hotstar

Indian television series
Indian television soap operas
Serial drama television series
2012 Indian television series debuts
Malayalam-language television shows
Indian drama television series
Asianet (TV channel) original programming